This article is about the particular significance of the year 1824 to Wales and its people.

Incumbents
Lord Lieutenant of Anglesey – Henry Paget, 1st Marquess of Anglesey 
Lord Lieutenant of Brecknockshire – Henry Somerset, 6th Duke of Beaufort
Lord Lieutenant of Caernarvonshire – Thomas Assheton Smith
Lord Lieutenant of Cardiganshire – William Edward Powell
Lord Lieutenant of Carmarthenshire – George Rice, 3rd Baron Dynevor 
Lord Lieutenant of Denbighshire – Sir Watkin Williams-Wynn, 5th Baronet    
Lord Lieutenant of Flintshire – Robert Grosvenor, 1st Marquess of Westminster 
Lord Lieutenant of Glamorgan – John Crichton-Stuart, 2nd Marquess of Bute 
Lord Lieutenant of Merionethshire – Sir Watkin Williams-Wynn, 5th Baronet
Lord Lieutenant of Montgomeryshire – Edward Clive, 1st Earl of Powis
Lord Lieutenant of Pembrokeshire – Sir John Owen, 1st Baronet
Lord Lieutenant of Radnorshire – George Rodney, 3rd Baron Rodney
Bishop of Bangor – Henry Majendie 
Bishop of Llandaff – William Van Mildert
Bishop of St Asaph – John Luxmoore 
Bishop of St Davids – Thomas Burgess

Events
January – The construction of the "leat" or "leete" at Loggerheads, Denbighshire, used in the local lead mining industry, is first recorded.
8 September – The Society of Cymmrodorion sponsors a major eisteddfod at Welshpool.
18 December – William Chambers inherits the Stepney estate.
dates unknown
The first gasometer in Wales is built at Greenfield, Flintshire.
Chess William Davies Evans develops the Evans Gambit.
Major repairs to Bangor Cathedral are begun.
Two new furnaces are erected at the Dyffryn ironworks by Anthony Hill.

Arts and literature

New books
T. G. Cumming – Description of the Iron Bridges of Suspension now erecting over the Strait of Menai at Bangor and over the River Conway
David Davis (Castellhywel) – Telyn Dewi
Benjamin Jones (P A Môn) – An Elegy on the death of Benjamin B. Jones, the eldest surviving child of B. Jones of Holyhead
Welsh Minstrelsy: Containing the Land beneath the Sea

Music
Seren Gomer (collection of hymns including Grongar by John Edwards)

Births
17 February – James Crichton-Stuart, politician (d. 1891)
March – Isaac D. Seyburn, Welsh-born merchant captain and naval officer (d. 1895)
17 April – John Basson Humffray, political reformer in Australia (d. 1891)
24 July – Robert Jones Derfel, poet (d. 1905)
15 December – Morgan Thomas, Welsh-born Australian surgeon and philanthropist (d. 1903)
date unknown – David James Jenkins, shipowner and politician (d. 1891)

Deaths
1 February – John Rice Jones, Welsh-born American politician and soldier, 64 
18 April – Edward Jones, harpist ("Bardd y Brenin"), 72
30 July – David Howell, American jurist of Welsh descent, 77
24 August – Thomas Parry, Chennai merchant, 56 (cholera)
November – William Moses, poet, 82
24 December – John Downman, artist, 74

References

 
Wales
Wales